Myristica pilosigemma is a species of plant in the family Myristicaceae. It is endemic to the Philippines.

References

Flora of the Philippines
pilosigemma
Taxonomy articles created by Polbot

Critically endangered flora of Asia